Pakala may refer to:

 Pakala, Tirupati district, Andhra Pradesh
 Pakala, Prakasam district, Andhra Pradesh
 Pakala, Nepal village and V.D.C., Pyuthan District, Nepal
 Pakala Lake, Warangal district
 Pakala, Senegal, a canton in Senegal
 Sricharan Pakala, Indian music composer